Žernov is a market town in Náchod District in the Hradec Králové Region of the Czech Republic. It has about 300 inhabitants.

Administrative parts
The hamlet of Rýzmburk is an administrative part of Žernov.

History
The first written mention of Žernov is from 1417. In that time, it was already referred to as a market town.

References

Market towns in the Czech Republic
Populated places in Náchod District